Flávia Maria de Oliveira Paparella (born 27 October 1981) is a Brazilian racing cyclist. She competed in the 2013 UCI Women's World Championship Road Race in Florence, as well as the 2014 UCI Women's Road World Championships in Ponferrada. She competed at the 2016 Olympic Games in Rio de Janeiro where she finished in seventh place, the highest placed finish for a Brazilian rider in any Olympic cycling event.

Oliveira is a past winner of the mountains classification at the Giro d'Italia Femminile in 2015, the Brazilian National Road Race Championships, and she was the winner of the general and mountain classifications at the 2016 Tour Cycliste Féminin International de l'Ardèche.

During a coaching session early in Oliveira's career, she recorded one of the highest V̇O2 max scores ever across all athletics for females.

Controls
In June 2009, in her first year as a professional, Oliveira tested positive for oxilofrine, a stimulant, while racing with the Italian professional team SC Michela Fanini at the Giro del Trentino Donne. The adverse finding came from a supplement purchased in the United States that did not include oxilofrine on the ingredients label.  In fact, several supplement companies were making products that contained oxilofrine without indicating the substance on the label.   Oliveira later sued the supplement manufacturer.  In December 2009 the ban was reduced through an appeal to CAS after the panel found that she had not intentionally ingested the banned substance and there was no way that she could have known that the supplement would have contained a banned substance. This would see her resume competition on 1 March 2011.

A second positive occurred nine years later on 26 June 2018 at the Brazilian Road Championships. Oliveira won the race and was allowed to maintain the title of champion of Brasil after the hearing.  In a unanimous decision, the arbitration panel ruled that Oliveira did not ingest the contaminant intentionally and in fact, the contaminant entered her system after the race had completed.  Oliveira returned to racing shortly after, recording her best ever finish in a World Cup Event at GP Plouay, where she finished 8th.

In 2020, the prescribed use of vilanterol to treat an acute condition caused an adverse finding for Oliveira. Oliveira established she had no significant fault or negligence with respect to the violation. USADA granted a TUE to Oliveira for the medication after the fact. Additionally, WADA made the determination that vilanterol is not performance enhancing and removed it from the 2021 prohibited list when used as Oliveira did.

2020 Olympic Bid
While preparing for the 2020 Summer Olympics, Oliveira was struck by a car and suffered a broken pelvis. After rehabilitation, Oliveira collected enough Olympic qualification points to provisionally qualify her for the 2020 Tokyo Olympics.  However, three weeks before the 2019 Road World Championships, Oliveira suffered a crash in the GP Fourmies in France that effectively ended her season.

Major results

2007
 1st Mount Diablo Hill Climb
 4th Vacaville Gran Prix
 5th Giro di San Francisco
 7th Mount Tamalpais Hill Climb
 7th Wente Vineyards Road Race
 8th Berkeley Hills Road Race
 9th Overall Mt. Hood Cycling Classic
2008
 1st  Overall California Cup
 1st Mount Tamalpais Hill Climb
 1st Stinson Beach Mt Tamalpais Hill Climb
 1st Dunnigan Hills Road Race
 1st San Ardo Road Race
 1st Patterson Pass Road Race
 2nd Santa Cruz University Road Race
 2nd Suisun Harbor Criterium	
 2nd Berkeley Bicycle Club Criterium
 3rd Mount Hamilton Classic
 3rd Mount Diablo Hill Climb
 4th Vacaville Gran Prix
 5th Wente Vineyards Road Race
 5th Giro di San Francisco
 6th Norlund Construction, Inc. Corporate Criterium
 6th Memorial Day Criterium
 7th Merco Credit Union – Downtown Grand Prix
 7th Davis 4th of July Criterium
2009
 4th Overall Tour Féminin en Limousin
 8th Giro del Friuli
 9th Overall La Route de France
2011
 2nd Mike's Bikes Cat's Hill Classic
 3rd Overall Sea Otter Classic
 National Road Championships
6th Time trial
7th Road race
 7th Road race, Pan American Road Championships
 9th Overall Giro della Toscana Int. Femminile – Memorial Michela Fanini
2012
 2nd Nevada City Classic
 3rd Road race, National Road Championships
 3rd Overall Madera Stage Race
 4th Snelling Road Race
 4th Memorial Cesare Del Cancia
 5th Berkeley Bicycle Club Criterium
 7th Overall Merco Classic
 7th Cherry Pie Criterium
 7th Muri Fermani – Forza Marina – Gianmarco Lorenzi
 7th San Rafael Twilight Criterium
2013
 1st Wente Vineyards Road Race
 1st Pescadero Coastal Classic
 1st Mount Diablo Hill Climb
 2nd Overall Sea Otter Classic
 2nd Overall Volta do México Copa Governador
 2nd Mount Hamilton Classic
 National Road Championships
3rd Road race
4th Time trial
 4th Berkeley Hills Road Race
 5th Overall San Dimas Stage Race
 6th San Rafael Twilight Criterium
 7th Road race, Pan American Championships
 7th Overall Cascade Cycling Classic
2014
 National Road Championships
2nd Road race
9th Time trial
 2nd Overall Vuelta Internacional Femenina a Costa Rica
1st Stage 1
 2nd Overall Tour of the Gila
 2nd Grand Prix de Oriente
 2nd Grand Prix cycliste de Gatineau
 4th Road race, Pan American Road Championships
 4th Overall Vuelta Ciclista Femenina a El Salvador
1st Stage 3
 5th Overall San Dimas Stage Race
 5th Overall Redlands Bicycle Classic
 5th Philadelphia Cycling Classic
 7th Grand Prix GSB
2015
 Military World Games
1st  Team road race
7th Road race
 2nd Overall Vuelta Internacional Femenina a Costa Rica
1st Stage 3 (ITT)
 National Road Championships
3rd Road race
3rd Time trial
 6th Overall Tour of California
 7th Overall Tour Femenino de San Luis
 7th Overall Giro d'Italia Femminile
1st  Mountains classification
 7th Overall Redlands Bicycle Classic
 8th Overall San Dimas Stage Race
 10th Overall Joe Martin Stage Race
 10th Overall Tour of the Gila
2016
 1st  Overall classification Tour Cycliste Féminin International de l'Ardèche
1st  Mountains classification
1st Stage 4
 1st  Mountains classification Tour de Feminin-O cenu Českého Švýcarska
 2nd Overall Tour de Pologne Féminin
1st Stage 2 (ITT)
 2nd Overall Giro della Toscana Int. Femminile – Memorial Michela Fanini
 3rd  Road race, Pan American Road Championships
 3rd Overall Vuelta Internacional Femenina a Costa Rica
1st Stage 1 (ITT)
 7th Road race, Olympic Games
 9th Overall 4. NEA
2017
 7th Overall Colorado Classic
 10th Overall Tour Cycliste Féminin International de l'Ardèche
 10th La Flèche Wallonne Féminine
2018
 National Road Championships
1st  Road race
3rd Time trial
 2nd Overall Vuelta Femenina a Guatemala
 6th Winston-Salem Cycling Classic
2019
 National Road Championships
2nd Road race
2nd Time trial
 3rd La Picto–Charentaise
 6th Overall Colorado Classic
 8th GP de Plouay – Bretagne

Notes

References

External links
 

1981 births
Living people
Brazilian female cyclists
Brazilian road racing cyclists
Brazilian sportspeople in doping cases
Cyclists at the 2016 Summer Olympics
Doping cases in cycling
Olympic cyclists of Brazil